The Ministry of the Popular Power for the Communal Economy (MINEP), also known as the Ministry for Popular Economy, is a ministry of the government of Venezuela which was created by Hugo Chávez in 2004. Succeeding the Ministry of the Social Economy, MINEP manages government relations with, and funding of, local and national cooperatives and microbusinesses.

List of ministers
 Pedro Morejón (2006–present)
 Olly Millan (2005-2006)
 Elias Jaua (2004-2005)

External links
 MINEP (in English)

Cooperatives ministries
Politics of Venezuela
Political organizations based in Venezuela
Cooperatives in Venezuela